Lynnville is an unincorporated community in Graves County, Kentucky, United States. On April 25, 2011, an EF1 tornado causing some damage, part of the 2011 Super Outbreak, traveled from Martin, Tennessee to Lynnville.

References

Unincorporated communities in Graves County, Kentucky
Unincorporated communities in Kentucky